The Vallejo is a houseboat in Sausalito, California, United States. It was originally a passenger ferry in Portland, Oregon, known as O&CRR Ferry No. 2, in the late 19th century. After falling into disuse in Portland, it was transported to the San Francisco Bay in California, where it was used as a ferry between Vallejo and Mare Island until the end of World War II. It was later purchased by a group led by artist Jean Varda, and repurposed as a houseboat, where a number of parties and salons were hosted by leading figures in the San Francisco area counterculture scene of the 1960s and '70s.

History
The Oregon & California Railroad Ferry No. 2 initially served Portland, providing connectivity between the East Portland terminus of the O&C Railroad line and Downtown Portland. The 414 ton boat was put into service in 1879 by Henry Villard, to replace an aging ferry initially set up by Ben Holladay. In November 1878, a drunken passenger had stepped off the boat before it landed, and drowned; the resulting legal action was ultimately appealed to the Oregon Supreme Court.

Differing accounts have Ferry No. 2 built on the East Coast and coming to Portland around Cape Horn, or else being built in Portland.

With the construction of the Steel Bridge in 1888, the ferry was no longer needed; after several idle years, it was transported to the San Francisco Bay, renamed Vallejo (no later than 1904), and converted to use coal and then oil for fuel. A bill of sale dated 1923 reflects a purchase by Robert Rauhauge of the Mare Island Line. It was put into service transporting workers and visitors between the city of Vallejo and Mare Island. Ferry service was discontinued after the end of World War II, and with the construction of a causeway connecting Mare Island and Vallejo; Vallejo was the last ferry to be retired. She was sold for scrap in 1947, and delivered to Sausalito to be broken up.

Restoration
Artist Jean Varda noticed the boat while its demolition was pending. He, surrealist Gordon Onslow Ford, and architect Forest Wright purchased it; Wright soon sold his third to Ford. They made extensive, improvised alterations, using scraps in the area, and turned the boat into an art studio and houseboat. Ford described it as "a place where artists blossomed, flowered", adding that "Varda set the tone" with his interest in entertaining.

Under the auspices of The Society For Comparative Philosophy ( 1962- 1984) poet Elsa Gidlow and philosopher Alan Watts bought Ford's share of the houseboat in 1961. The ferry was then used as home base for Alan and Jano Watts and meeting place for hundreds of Society functions. The Society's parties and salons continued.

Houseboat Summit
A gathering on the Vallejo was known as the "Houseboat Summit" featured Timothy Leary, Allen Ginsberg, Gary Snyder and Watts discussing LSD and life style issues; The famous discussion can be found in the counterculture magazine the San Francisco Oracle.

Later life
Vallejo deteriorated badly during the 1960s. Varda died suddenly in 1971, as did Watts in 1973. Talks continued  on the boat after Watts’ death, from 1978 Alfred Sorensen, a mystic known as Sunyata held weekly meetings there where he would answer questions from visitors.

Marian Saltman, who had begun living on Vallejo in 1971, arranged for its purchase in 1981, and began to restore the boat. She said, "I hope she will continue to be the home of remarkable people and ideas, and I wish her to serve the creative and artistic needs of Sausalito and the Bay Area."
 
Vallejo was transferred across the San Francisco Bay to an Alameda shipyard for repairs in 2000, and then returned to her dock in Sausalito. A new fiberglass outer hull was constructed and installed. The houseboat operates as a private residence with no visitation permitted.

References

External links 
 Memoirs of Henry Villard, Vol. 2, Book 8 contains relevant information about the projects which replaced the ferry at the terminus of the O&CRR line.

Ferries of Oregon
Steamboats of the Willamette River
Ferries of California
Culture in the San Francisco Bay Area
Houseboats
1879 ships
History of Marin County, California